Giles Fettiplace (died 1641), of Poulton, Wiltshire, was an English politician.

He was a Member (MP) of the Parliament of England for Devizes in 1601.

References

Year of birth missing
1641 deaths
People from Wiltshire
English MPs 1601